J. Claude Rumsey House, also known as the Rumsey-Nomanson House, is a historic home located at 709 Michigan Avenue in Lowell, Lake County, Indiana.  It was built in 1906, and is a 2-story, Queen Anne stick built home with a cross-gable roof.  It sits on a concrete foundation, which was quite modern at the time, and features a round corner tower with fishscale shingles and a wraparound porch.

It was listed in the National Register of Historic Places in 2008.

References

Houses on the National Register of Historic Places in Indiana
Queen Anne architecture in Indiana
Houses completed in 1906
Buildings and structures in Lake County, Indiana
National Register of Historic Places in Lake County, Indiana
1906 establishments in Indiana